Herol Graham (born 13 September 1959) is a British former professional boxer who competed from 1978 to 1998. A three-time world title challenger, he is generally acknowledged as one of the best British boxers of the post-war era to have never won a world championship.

Amateur career

Highlights
1976 Junior World Welterweight Champion (beat John Mugabi in final)

1977 Senior ABA Light-Middleweight finalist (lost to Steve Hopkin)

1978 Senior ABA Middleweight Champion

Professional career
In 1978, after winning the ABA middleweight title, Graham turned professional, fighting out of Brendan Ingle's gym in the Wincobank area of Sheffield.

Graham went undefeated in his first 38 fights, winning the British, Commonwealth and European light-middleweight titles, as well as the British and European middleweight titles. He eventually lost his unbeaten record defending his European middleweight title against future world champion Sumbu Kalambay in 1987. Graham would go on to fight for world titles twice at middleweight and once at super middleweight. In his first attempt, challenging for the vacant WBA middleweight title, he took Mike McCallum to a close split decision; points deducted for a punch to the back of McCallum's head 
ended up costing Graham the verdict. A year later, in another world title challenge, he lost to Julian Jackson for the vacant WBC middleweight title. After outclassing Jackson for nearly 4 rounds, Graham was knocked out cold before he hit the canvas by the now-famous devastating right cross known as the 'Punch of the Century'.

Four years of inactivity were followed by an unexpected comeback in which Graham put together a series of victories to gain a last shot at a world title in March 1998. Challenging Charles Brewer for his IBF super middleweight title, Graham was stopped in the tenth round. Following this he retired from the ring and now lives in London, working as a personal trainer and specialising in boxing-based exercises.

In February 2009, Graham's son was injured in what police described as a "targeted shooting" at Westfield, Sheffield.

Graham released his autobiography entitled Bomber: Behind the Laughter in 2011.

Graham has ongoing mental health issues from boxing injuries.

Personal life
Graham's parents are Jamaican.

Professional boxing record

References

External links

1959 births
Living people
Boxers from Nottingham
British Boxing Board of Control champions
Commonwealth Boxing Council champions
England Boxing champions
English male boxers
English people of Jamaican descent
European Boxing Union champions
Light-middleweight boxers
Middleweight boxers
Super-middleweight boxers